Shalva Natelashvili (born 17 February 1958) is a Georgian politician, a founder of the Georgian Labour Party and its chair since 1995. He is a president of the International Geopolitical Center.

Early life and career
Natelashvili was born in the town of Pasanauri, in the northern mountainous part of Georgia. He graduated from Tbilisi State University faculty of law, in 1981 and pursued his post-graduate degree at Diplomatic Academy of the Ministry of Foreign Affairs of the Russian Federation, majoring in international law. In 1981, he started his career at the General Prosecutor's Office of Georgia as an investigator and was promoted to the position of Prosecutor and later to Head of Department for International Relations. In 2004, he studied in the Leadership Program by the US State Department. Natelashvili is an honorary envoy of the state of Louisiana, a member of the International Association of Lawyers, a member of Academy of National and Social Sciences, a member of Association of International Law and has been granted a title of peace ambassador.

Early political career

Natelashvili started his political career in 1992 when he won a landslide victory in the parliamentary elections and became a majoritarian MP for the Dusheti region. He was then elected Head of Committee for Legal Affairs and chaired the Parliamentary Committee for First Constitution of Georgia. He is an author of the laws about citizenship, gun laws, the legal status of people without citizenship, parliamentary commissions and committees, parliamentary factions and political parties, the legal status of foreign citizens, and immigration and migration. Natelashvili also led the procedures to ensure that Georgia was integrated with international treaties of human rights.

In 1995, Natelashvili established the first political entity, the Georgian Labour Party (GLP). Since its inception the GLP turned into an influential political force in the country. It won a series of court trials, which resulted in the legalization of free secondary school nationwide, the reduction of electricity tariff for three years and won many other legal battles, which improved social conditions of the Georgian population. GLP has never joined any other political blocs or alliances and always runs for parliament independently. However, the GLP is currently supporting the creation of a coalition government in Georgia.

Elections 
In 1995,  Natelashvili won another landslide victory in the first round of the elections. He was a member of parliamentary bureau and collegium, chairman of the Elector's faction and Labour Party's faction in parliament. He also served as the co-chair of the parliamentary coalition United Georgia.

In 1998, the GLP  garnered 17 percent of the votes and ended up second in the parliamentary elections where 40 percent of the Georgian population participated. However, the GLP was not allowed to use its parliamentary mandate, even though the OSCE had confirmed that the GLP won the elections. In 1998, the GLP won 20 percent of the votes in the local self-government elections, and it received 26 percent of the votes municipal elections four years later in 2002.

The GLP  achieved big success in the parliamentary elections of 2002 where Natelashvili's party won the majority seats in Tbilisi City Assembly (Tbilisi Sakrebulo), receiving 26%.

In 2003, Natelashvili and the Georgian Labour Party acquired seats in Parliament with 12.5% of votes. Nonetheless, the party was not allowed to use its mandate, as an authorized institution illegally dissolved the parliament in the aftermath of the Rose Revolution. The rerun of the elections in 2004 was fraudulent, which left the party without the mandates. The European Court of Human Rights recognized the Georgian Labour Party and Natelashvili as the victim of the falsified elections in its decision dated 8 July 2008.

As a result of violence and vote rigging in the presidential elections of 5 January 2008, the Central Election Commission of Georgia declared that Natelashvili only gathered 6.5 per cent of the votes. The Georgian Labour Party cleared the election threshold in the parliamentary elections of 2008 and won the mandates in the parliament, despite the large-scale election fraud. Nonetheless, the Georgian Labour Party decided to boycott the parliamentary sessions in protest of the ballot fraud.

Controversies
In November 2007, Natelashvili led the anti-governmental protest rallies and the demonstrations were forcefully dissolved. Natelashvili's house and the party were raided by special forces and searched. The party leader had to flee for several days while the prosecutor's office accused Natelashvili of state treason and organizing mass unrest. The government revoked all its allegations after the international community and the US ambassador to Georgia John F. Tefft intervened and cancelled the arrest warrant.

On 1 October 2012, Georgian billionaire Bidzina Ivanishvili's party, the Georgian Dream, took power in Tbilisi and the attacks and pressure on the Georgian Labour Party mounted. The political repercussions are thought by some to be steered by Bidzina Ivanishvili, who accused Natelashvili of having a clandestine alliance with former president of Georgia Mikheil Saakashvili.

Natelashvili has allegedly survived several assassination attempts, including a blast at the Georgian Labour Party's head office, which killed party activist Nino Giorgobiani. Walls, window glasses and ceiling are ruined, and one of the guards was injured. In addition, four people, including one child, were hurt and taken to the hospital.  The government of Georgia blamed the explosion on the Russian special services.

Personal life
Natelashvili is married to Bela Alania (a lawyer and a writer) and has a son Beka Natelashvili and a daughter Darejan Natelashvili.

Natelashili is often seen in the Russian-Georgian conflict zones where he organizes rallies to protest against illegal construction of borders and fences on the territory of Georgia by the Russian armed forces.

References

External links
Georgian Labour Party - Official Web-Page
International Geopolitical Center - Official Web-Page
 

Diplomatic Academy of the Ministry of Foreign Affairs of the Russian Federation alumni
1958 births
Living people
Georgian Labour Party politicians
Tbilisi State University alumni
People from Mtskheta-Mtianeti